Krom may refer to:
Krom, one of the Administrative divisions of Cambodia
Krom, a Thai-language term which may refer to:
Krom, each of the Thai government ministries under the historical chatusadom system
Krom, a form of Thai royal title
Krom, a type of Thai government agency, translated as department
Krom River, a river in the Eastern Cape Province in South Africa
Kampuchea Krom, a region of the Mekong Delta now part of Vietnam
Khmer Krom, the ethnic Khmer people of that region
Phnom Krom, a hill close to Siem Reap, Cambodia
Pskov Krom, an ancient citadel in Pskov, Russia 
Krom Stone House and Dutch Barn, a historic home and Dutch barn located at Rochester in Ulster County, New York

People
Krom Hendricks, South African cricketer
Krom Ngoy (Poet Ou; 1865–1936), Khmer poet 
Beth Krom (born 1958), American politician
Toomas Krõm (born 1971), Estonian football player

See also
KROM
Chromium (film), a 2015 Albanian film, released as  Krom in Albania